Adam Friedrich Zürner (15 August 1679 – 18 December 1742) was a German cartographer and geographer.

1679 births
1742 deaths
German cartographers
German geographers